If You Believe may refer to:

 If You Believe (film)
 "If You Believe", a 1955 song by Johnnie Ray with Percy Faith & His Orchestra
 "If You Believe" (George Harrison song)
 "If You Believe" (Kenny Loggins song)
 "If You Believe" (Sasha song)
 "If You Believe" (Chantay Savage song)
 "If You Believe", a song by Blues Saraceno from the album Indie Pop
 "If You Believe", a song by Irving Berlin
 If You Believe, 1999 album by Jim Brickman